The 2000 Rugby League World Cup squads consisted of players from the national rugby league football teams of fifteen countries: Australia, England, Fiji, Russia, New Zealand, Wales, Lebanon, Cook Islands, Papua New Guinea, France, Tonga, South Africa, Ireland, Samoa and Scotland.

Australia
Head coach:  Chris Anderson

England
Head coach:  John Kear

Fiji
Head coach:  Don Furner

Russia
Head coach:  Evgeniy Klebanov

New Zealand
Head coach:  Frank Endacott

  Note*: one of the goals was a field goal.

Wales
Head coach:  Clive Griffiths

 Note*: Both goals were field goals.

Lebanon
Head coach:  John Elias

Cook Islands
Head coach:  Stan Martin

Papua New Guinea
Head coach:  Bob Bennett

* Field Goal

France
Head coach:  Gilles Dumas

Tonga
Head coach:  Murray Hurst

South Africa
Head coach:  Paul Matete

Ireland
Head coach:  Ralph Rimmer

 Gary Connolly and Anthony Stewart were originally named in the 24-man squad but withdrew due to injury.  They were replaced by Liam Tallon and Martin Crompton.

Samoa
Head coach:  Darrell Williams

 Note: field goal.

Aotearoa Māori
Head coach:  Cameron Bell

 Note * : One of the goals was a field goal.

Scotland
Head coach:  Shaun McRae

Notes and references

Positions

References

Squads
Rugby League World Cup squads